Adamma was a goddess from the pantheon of Ebla, later incorporated into Hurrian religion.

Origin 
Alfonso Archi, a researcher of Eblaite culture and religion, considers Adamma to most likely be one of the Syrian deity names with origins in a pre-Semitic and pre-Hurrian substratum, much like Hadabal, Ishara, Kura or Aštabi. Another possibility he considers is that her name was derived from the root *ʾdm, meaning "blood" or "red." Francesco Aspesi derives it from the Hebrew Adamah, the word for "(red) soil, earth".  

Hittitologist Piotr Taracha also considers her to be a "Syrian substrate" deity incorporated into Hurrian religion, and based on proposed origin groups her with Aštabi, Ishara, Kubaba, Shalash and others.

Archi proposes that after the fall of Ebla Adamma was among the deities who did not retain their former position in the religion of the Amorites, who became the dominant culture in Syria. He lists Ammarik, Aštabi, Šanugaru and Halabatu as other similar examples. He assumes that they were reduced to the status of deities of at best local significance, and as a result were easily incorporated into the religion of the Hurrians when they arrived in the same area a few centuries later.

In Eblaite religion 
Adamma was the spouse of Resheph in Eblaite texts. However, they are not associated with each other anymore in sources from the second millennium BCE.

A ritual dedicated to deceased kings of Ebla featured 8 deities, 6 of them arranged in pairs: Hadabal and his spouse (only known as Baaltum, "the Lady"), Resheph and Adamma, Agu and Guladu, and additionally a deity whose name is missing identified as "of Darib" (a village connected to cult of deceased kings) and Ishara. Administrative records mention the purchase of belts for Adamma. However, in offering lists she overall appears less frequently than Kura, Hadabal, Resheph or Ishara. Additionally, Adamma was among the Eblaite deities who seemingly didn't have any annual renewal rite (the prime example of which was the yearly preparation of a new silver face for the statue of Kura). Other deities sharing this characteristic were Kura's spouse Barama and Ishara.

Adamma also did not appear as a theophoric element in personal names. The only possible "substratum" deities recorded in such a role are Kura and, much less frequently, Hadabal. Alfonso Archi interprets this as a sign that name-giving traditions of Ebla predated the contact with the culture of the "substratum" from which these deities were originally received.

The epithet gunu(m), associated most commonly with Resheph, occasionally was linked to Adamma as well. Its meaning is uncertain. While it has been proposed that gunu(m) was a burial place (based on Ugaritic parallels), Alfonso Archi notes Resheph does not appear to have a connection to funerals in Eblaite texts, and that in this context he was instead most commonly associated with Ea, Kura or the sun deity.

Hadani was a mayor center of worship of Adamma and her husband in the Ebla period. It was possible for daughters of kings of allied cities (the recorded example being the princess of Huzan) to become the dam-digir ("woman of the deity"), or head priestess, of Adamma in that location. Analogous offices existed for Hadabal, but these were seemingly reserved for Eblaite princesses. Daughters of viziers were dam-digir of unspecified deities as well. The fact that Adamma is a goddess rather than a god indicates that it's far from certain if dam-digir can be understood as a priestess partaking in a "sacred marriage" ritual as sometimes proposed, according to Alfonso Archi.

Another important cult center of Adamma and Resheph was Tunip, likely located close to Hamat, a settlement associated with Hadabal.

Later relevance
After the fall of Ebla, some of the deities largely unique to its pantheon disappeared from records, most notably Kura, Barama and Hadabal. The fate of Adamma, as well as Aštabi, Saggar and a number of other Eblaite deities, was different. While for the most part they had no major role in religion of the Amorites (Ishara being a partial exception), who became the dominant power in Syria after the fall of Ebla, the Hurrians, who spread through the region in the early second millennium BCE, incorporated them into own religion.

Adamma formed a dyad with Kubaba in Hurrian sources. Worship of pairs of deities almost as if they were a unity was a common feature of Hurrian religion and other examples include Allani and Ishara, Ninatta and Kulitta, Hutena and Hutellura and Pinikir and Goddess of the Night.

Sometimes the Adamma-Kubaba dyad was expanded into a trio with the addition of the goddess Hašuntarhi.

In rituals linked to the hišuwa festival from Kizzuwatna Adamma appeared alongside other Hurrian deities, Kubaba and Nupatik.

In Emar a month was named after her.

References

Bibliography

.

Hurrian deities
Hittite deities
Eblaite deities
Ugaritic deities